Walter Nelson may refer to:
 Duke Nelson (Walter John Nelson), American college athletics coach and administrator
  Walter "Papoose" Nelson, American R&B guitarist

See also
 Walter Nelson-Rees, cell culture worker and cytogeneticist